The Rupsha Express (Train No. 727/728) is a train that runs from Chilahati, in Southwestern Bengal, to Khulna, in North Bengal. It is operated by Bangladesh Railway. Another train, the Simanta Express, also travels this route.

Routes 
The train route from Chilahati to Khulna is the longest route in Bangladesh. It was launched on 5 May 1986.

Timing 
The train runs from Chilahati daily, departing at 8:00 am and reaching Khulna at 5:40 pm. It leaves Khulna at 7:25 am daily and reaches Chilahati at 5:00 pm.

References 

Passenger rail transport in Bangladesh